The fencing competition at the 1975 Mediterranean Games was held in Algiers, the capital of Algeria.

Medalists

Men's events

Women's events

Medal table

References
1975 Mediterranean Games report at the International Committee of Mediterranean Games (CIJM) website
List of Olympians who won medals at the Mediterranean Games at Olympedia.org

M
Sports at the 1975 Mediterranean Games
1975